Choi Jong-Bum (born 27 March 1978) is a former South Korea football midfielder.

Choi made his South Korea national football team debut on 29 February 2003 in a match against Nepal at Asian Cup qualification.

External links 

KFA Player Record 

1978 births
Living people
South Korean footballers
Pohang Steelers players
Gimcheon Sangmu FC players
Daegu FC players
K League 1 players
Korea National League players
Yeungnam University alumni

Association football midfielders